Quincy Township may refer to:

Quincy Township, Adams County, Illinois
Quincy Township, Adams County, Iowa
Quincy Township, Greenwood County, Kansas
Quincy Township, Branch County, Michigan
Quincy Township, Houghton County, Michigan
Quincy Township, Olmsted County, Minnesota
Quincy Township, Franklin County, Pennsylvania

See also
 Quincy (disambiguation)

Township name disambiguation pages